Jamie Paul Durie OAM (born 3 June 1970) is an Australian horticulturalist and landscape designer, furniture designer, television host, television producer, and author of eleven books on landscape architecture, garden design and lifestyle. He is the founder and director of a design company PATIO Landscape Architecture and Durie Design and also is a 2008 Gold Medal winner at Britain's prestigious Royal Horticultural Society (RHS) Chelsea Flower Show in Chelsea, London for Australian Garden and designed by Durie. As of 2018, Durie has hosted more than 50 design shows around the world.

Durie was the television host of the 2008 Australian lifestyle program The Outdoor Room, broadcast on the Seven Network. He hosted the dynamic design makeover show HGTV Showdown in 2009. Durie hosted the US PBS series The Victory Garden from 2007 to 2010. The show is PBS network's longest-running gardening TV series.

Following the end of The Outdoor Room on the Seven Network in 2010, Durie relocated the concept of the series to broadcast on the American HGTV network as The Outdoor Room with Jamie Durie. Unable to bring his own Australian design team along, Durie put together a new team of top-notch designers, horticulturists and contractors. In his HGTV series, Durie rescues forlorn yards in Southern California with design schemes inspired by gardens and landscapes from around the world. Filmed mostly in and around Los Angeles, The Outdoor Room with Jamie Durie uses sustainable ideas - such as low-water plantings and reclaimed hardscape - to design intimate, livable environments for erstwhile non-gardeners.

Since 2015, Durie has co-presented as a visiting expert in gardening & landscaping, on the Australian lifestyle program, The Living Room, which airs on Network Ten.

Durie is currently contracted to RUSH Entertainment Group, that organises events.

Early life
Durie was born in Manly, northern Sydney, New South Wales, and spent his formative years living in the mining town Tom Price in the Pilbara region of Western Australia, with his mother and maternal grandmother both Sri Lankan. His grandmother, Daphne de Zylva, was born in Sri Lanka and met his English grandfather in the air force during World War II. They moved to Australia in the 1950s. Durie recalls that he and his grandmother baked and gardened together. She taught him how to make his first curry. He has inherited a love of the Sri Lankan culture and lifestyle. His parents separated when Durie was age 10, and he relocated with his mother and brother Chris, to the Gold Coast, in Queensland. His paternal grandmother, called Nanna, was a volunteer surf-lifesaver on the NSW Central Coast. Having left high-school in Brisbane at age 15, he tried his hand at cabinetmaking, and modeled beachwear part-time. Durie got his showbiz start in his teens as an exotic dancer in the Australian all-male revue troupe called Manpower Australia. Durie's agent introduced him to Manpower Australia, a touring dance troupe best known for its male dance performances and for its dancers' distinctive physical attractiveness and sex appeal. For seven years, Durie toured internationally with Manpower Australia, acting as manager, and also as principal dancer, performing acrobatics and trapeze acts to large audience venues in Las Vegas, NV. "I was the lead performer and designed the sets and costumes" he says. Durie notes that while Manpower Australia was perceived as putting the risqué into risky, the shows were highly professional acts that even his grandmother was comfortable with. The timing was ideal, as "The 1960s, 1970s and 1980s in Australia were very chauvinistic and the female body was overexploited", as he explains, "There needed to be social change." Retiring from Manpower Australia at age 26, Durie made up for his early exit from schooling by completing a four-year horticultural and landscape design course.

Landscape design and television hosting
Durie founded the landscape design company Patio Landscape Architecture and Design in 1998. In 2002, Durie registered the Australian business company, JPD Media & Design.

Within a few short years, he made hosting appearances on Australian reality show DIY television programs. Durie was the main host and the lead landscaper on the garden makeover program Backyard Blitz, on the Nine Network - created and produced by horticulturist Don Burke - from 2000 to 2005. Don Burke, whose production company recruited Durie in 1999 to front Backyard Blitz , describes him as a "born showman".

Durie was the host on the TV renovation show The Block, on the Nine Network. The original The Block TV series first ran for two consecutive seasons in 2003 and 2004, hosted by Durie.

In 2007, Durie participated in the 6th Australian series of Dancing with the Stars, in which he was eliminated in 7th place, on 17 April 2007.
 
In 2007, Durie hosted Australia's Best Backyards on the Seven Network. The show was a lifestyle garden program, similar to Backyard Blitz on the Nine Network.

In 2007, Durie has filmed lifestyle segments with Oprah Winfrey, on the Oprah Winfrey Network (U.S. TV channel), whom he credits as giving him his US TV breakthrough. Durie states that Winfrey "wholly and solely" is responsible for his career being launched in the US. When Oprah came calling, Durie relocated to the US. And with her ringing endorsement it meant that executive doors were opened, and Durie's already significant businesses were expanded in a country far bigger than Australia.

Durie hosted the US PBS series The Victory Garden from 2007 to 2010. The show is PBS network's longest running gardening TV series, which equips viewers with the confidence and inspiration to roll up their sleeves and get their hands dirty in the garden and in the kitchen. Durie hosted the dynamic design makeover show HGTV Showdown on the HGTV network in 2009.

In 2008, Durie was the television host of the Australian lifestyle program The Outdoor Room, broadcast on Seven Network, with repeats broadcast on 7Two. The premise of the show was that Durie set out to "bring the world to your very own backyard".

Following the end of The Outdoor Room show on the Seven Network, in 2010, Durie relocated the concept of the series to broadcast on the HGTV network as The Outdoor Room with Jamie Durie. Unable to bring his own Australian design team along, Durie put together a new team of designers, horticulturists and contractors. In his HGTV series, Durie rescues forlorn yards in Southern California with design schemes inspired by gardens and landscapes from around the world. Filmed mostly in and around Los Angeles, The Outdoor Room with Jamie Durie uses sustainable ideas, such as low-water plantings and reclaimed hardscape, to design intimate, livable environments for erstwhile non-gardeners.

Since 2015, Durie has co-presented as a visiting expert in gardening & landscaping, on the Australian lifestyle program, The Living Room, a quad-triple award-winner of the Logie Award for Most Popular Lifestyle Program, that airs on Network Ten.

In 2019, Durie joined Australia's Seven Network reality renovation series House Rules as a new judge.

Furniture design and merchandise lines
In 2010, Durie's company Patio Landscape Architecture and Design was renamed Durie Design, committed to not just rejuvenating the existing gardens, but offering new exciting outdoor destinations for the clients, and with an emphasis on funky furniture design.

With his furniture design success, Durie has worked for Hollywood celebrity clients, such as designing 100 pieces of furniture for American talk show host and comedian Chelsea Handler and he designed garden landscapes for actress Charlize Theron for two years.

Awards and accolades
The Australian reality television garden makeover program Backyard Blitz, on the Nine Network, was the winner of six Logie Awards of Most Popular Lifestyle Program (from 2001 until 2006). Durie won the Logie Award for the Most Popular New Talent award in 2001, and was nominated for the Most Popular Presenter award for his role in Backyard Blitz from 2003 to 2005.

Durie's 2003 landscape design book, Patio - Garden Design and Inspiration, (Allen & Unwin - ) was short-listed APA Book Design Awards, for Best Designed Illustrated Book 2003 Australia.

In 2008, Durie won a gold medal at Britain's prestigious Royal Horticultural Society (RHS) Chelsea Flower Show in Chelsea, London. A team of 22 workers built the AU$800,000, 200sqm celebration of the Kimberley landscape, called Australian Garden and designed by Durie, in 16 days. Australian Garden won one of the eight Gold Medals given in the Show Garden category. All the materials were shipped from Australia.

In 2012, Durie was awarded the Medal of the Order of Australia (OAM) for services to the environment, and charity work.

In 2013, Durie began collaborating with the Italian luxury furniture brand Natuzzi Group Riva 1920. Durie and Riva 1920 launched a bespoke collection of five furniture pieces, including the Tubular dining table, to widespread acclaim at Milan Furniture Fair 2013. The Tubular table and chair (the range also includes bookshelves) and Durie's Bungalow range were both finalists in the New York Design Awards, announced in Manhattan on 20 May 2014, for Product Design Category, Furniture Indoor & Outdoor.

Bibliography
 Patio : Garden Design and Inspiration - Author: Jamie Durie (2003), Allen & Unwin Publishers (Reprint: 2016).
 Outdoor Kids: A Practical Guide for Kids in the Garden - Author: Jamie Durie (2005), Jamie Durie Publisher.
 Inspired : The Ideas That Shape and Create My Design - Author: Jamie Durie (2006), HarperCollins Publishers.
 100 Gardens - Author: Jamie Durie (2011), Allen & Unwin Publishers.
 The Outdoor Room - Author: Jamie Durie (2011), HarperCollins Publishers.
 Edible Garden Design: Delicious Designs from the Ground Up - Author: Jamie Durie (2014), Lantern Australia Publishers.
 The Source Book: Plants, Materials, Products and Ideas for Contemporary Outdoor Spaces & Where to Get Them - Author: Jamie Durie (2011), HarperCollins Publishers.
 Living Design - Authors: Jamie Durie and Nadine Bush (2016), Lantern Australia Publishers.

2012–2017 company lawsuit 
As of 2012, Durie has been engaged in a legal battle for a breach of contract claim brought by a disgruntled former business manager and licensing agent, Michael Curnow. Curnow sued Durie after Curnow's services were terminated. At the start, Durie declared he would fight the breach of contract claim worth more than AU$750,000 brought by Curnow, who worked in the Mona Vale office of Durie's landscape and interior design business, Durie Design.

In the NSW Supreme Court case, in September 2017, Justice Michael Slattery found largely in favour of Curnow. Durie, who was partially victorious over a claim by Curnow for commissions on work brought to Durie by other agents, disputes that he would be facing damages of more than AU$800,000 as claimed by Curnow. Costs are yet to be determined with a directions hearing in late 2017, though after a 3½-year legal battle and some of the most expensive lawyers in the country, final costs could be another AU$800,000. Durie was reluctant to discuss the judgment when The Sydney Morning Herald spoke with him at the time of the ruling, although he did express his disappointment at the finding and that he had been targeted "because I have a public profile ...that guy has made millions out of me over the years".

In June 2018, it was reported that Durie's company JPD Media & Design has been forced into voluntary administration, with Simon Cathro from Worrells Solvency and Forensic Accountants appointed to look into the company's financial situation.

Personal life 
Durie owns properties in Pittwater, on the Northern Beaches of Sydney, Australia, and in Los Angeles. Durie is unmarried, but he has been engaged three times. He has stated, "I've always been career-focused and my relationships have suffered because of that". Durie's former partner, Nadine Bush, is the creative director at Durie Design, and is the co-author of Living Design (2016, Lantern Australia Publishers). Durie says she is a friend and colleague.

Durie has a grown-up daughter who lives in Los Angeles named Taylor, from his previous relationship with Michelle Glennock. Durie says, "We go camping together, surfing and bike riding". Durie describes his life as "I want simply to find more balance and walk down the little path of self discovery...".

Durie is currently engaged to Ameka Jane. They have a daughter, Beau J Durie, born in July 2021.

Each year, Durie donates his time and resources to many charities, including FSHD Global Research Foundation facioscapulohumeral muscular dystrophy (FSHD), the Children's Cancer Institute and The Children's Hospital at Westmead (also called the Royal Alexandra Hospital for Children or Sydney Children's Hospital Network, Westmead), Sydney, New South Wales, Australia.

Filmography
Television

References

External link

1970 births
Living people
People from Manly, New South Wales
Australian artisans
Australian company founders
Australian environmentalists
Australian game show hosts
Australian gardeners
Australian horticulturists
Australian people of Sri Lankan descent
Australian landscape or garden designers
Furniture designers
Recipients of the Medal of the Order of Australia